This is a list of notable academic journals in the field of mathematics education.

C
College Mathematics Journal

E
Educational Studies in Mathematics

F
For the Learning of Mathematics

I
International Journal of Science and Mathematics Education
Investigations in Mathematics Learning

J
Journal for Research in Mathematics Education
Journal of Mathematics Teacher Education

M
The Mathematics Educator
The Mathematics Enthusiast
Mathematics Teacher
Mathematics Teaching

P
Philosophy of Mathematics Education Journal
Problems, Resources, and Issues in Mathematics Undergraduate Studies

S
Science & Education

T
Teaching Mathematics and Its Applications

See also
List of probability journals
List of statistics journals
List of mathematics journals

External links
Online list of some journals in mathematics education

Mathematics education